Protergia is the biggest private company for the production and supply of electricity and natural gas in Greece. It is a subsidiary and is 100% owned by the Mytilineos Group.

History 
In July 2010, the Mytilineos Group agreed with Enel to acquire 50.01% of Endesa Hellas, which then belonged to Endesa SA. The Mytilineos Group thus becomes the sole shareholder of Endesa Hellas which will soon be called Protergia. Until the end of 2013, Protergia was exclusively an energy producer, while in January 2014 it started to be active in the supply of electricity and in January 2018 in the supply of natural gas.

References 

Electric power companies of Greece
Companies based in Athens
Greek companies established in 2014